The Government of the Australian Capital Territory, also referred to as the Australian Capital Territory Government or ACT Government, is the executive authority of the Australian Capital Territory, one of the territories of Australia. The leader of the party or coalition with the confidence of the Australian Capital Territory Legislative Assembly forms Government. Unlike the Australian States and the Northern Territory, the Australian Capital Territory Legislative Assembly directly elects one of their number to be the Chief Minister of the Australian Capital Territory as the head of the Government, rather than being appointed by a Governor or Administrator.

Since December 2014, the Chief Minister of the Australian Capital Territory has been Andrew Barr, leader of the Labor Party. Following the 2020 ACT election, the Government has been formed by a coalition of ten Labor members and six Greens members. The terms of the coalition are outlined in the Parliamentary and Governing Agreement for the 10th Legislative Assembly for the Australian Capital Territory.

Ministers are appointed by the Chief Minister. The current ministry of the Australian Capital Territory (Third Barr Ministry) comprises nine of the twenty five Members of the Australian Capital Territory Legislative Assembly.

Constitutional framework
The ACT has internal self-government, but Australia's Constitution does not afford the territory government the full legislative independence provided to Australian states. Government for the Australian Capital Territory is outlined in Commonwealth legislation; the Australian Capital Territory (Self-Government) Act 1988. Nonetheless, the ACT is governed according to the principles of the Westminster System, a form of parliamentary government based on the model of the United Kingdom.

Legislative power rests with the unicameral Australian Capital Territory Legislative Assembly.

Executive power rests formally with the Executive, which consists of the Chief Minister and Ministers, and is informally called the Cabinet.

Judicial power is exercised by the Supreme Court of the Australian Capital Territory and a system of subordinate courts, but the High Court of Australia and other federal courts have overriding jurisdiction on matters which fall under the ambit of the Australian Constitution.

The ACT does not have a separate system of local government such as that seen in the Australian States and the Northern Territory. In the ACT, government functions that would usually be handled by local government are instead directly handled by the Territory government.

Current Ministry

The current arrangement of the incumbent ministry (Third Barr Ministry) of the ACT was appointed on 4 November 2020, comprising six Labor Party members and three Greens members.

ACT Government Directorates

The ACT Government is served by a unified ACT Public Service agency, reporting to a single Head of Service.

Administrative units, known as Directorates, are grouped under areas of portfolio responsibility. Each Directorate is led by a Director-General who reports to one or more Ministers.

, there are nine Directorates:

Canberra Health Services
Chief Minister, Treasury and Economic Development Directorate (CMTEDD)
Community Services Directorate
Education Directorate
Environment, Planning and Sustainable Development Directorate (EPSDD)
Health Directorate
Justice and Community Safety Directorate
Major Projects Canberra
Transport Canberra and City Services Directorate (TCCS)

Agencies and Authorities
City Renewal Authority
Suburban Land Agency

Independent Authorities
Independent Competition and Regulatory Commission
Office of the Work Health and Safety Commissioner

Public Authorities and Territory Owned Corporations
The ACT Government also has a number of Public Authorities and Territory Owned Corporations:

 ACT Building & Construction Industry Training Fund Board: providing funding for the training of eligible workers in the ACT building and construction industry.
ACT Long Service Leave Authority: administers portable long service leave schemes.
ACT Teacher Quality Institute: an independent statutory authority established to build the professional standing of ACT teachers and to enhance the community’s confidence in the teaching profession through professional regulation and practical initiatives to raise teacher quality.
Canberra Institute of Technology (CIT) is the ACT Government operated vocational educational provider.
Cultural Facilities Corporation: manages the Canberra Theatre Centre; the Canberra Museum and Gallery (CMAG).
EvoEnergy: owns and operates the ACT electricity and gas networks as well as gas networks in Queanbeyan and Palerang shires and Nowra.
Icon Water Limited: providing drinking water and wastewater services to the ACT and surrounding regions.

The following are officers of the Australian Capital Territory Legislative Assembly:

ACT Audit Office: responsible for the audit of all ACT public sector agencies.
ACT Electoral Commission: an independent statutory authority responsible for conducting elections and referendums for the Australian Capital Territory Legislative Assembly.
ACT Integrity Commissioner: responsible for investigating alleged corrupt conduct in the Legislative Assembly and the ACT Public Sector.
ACT Ombudsman: manages complaints about unfair treatment by ACT Government agencies.

See also
Australian Capital Territory Legislative Assembly
Australian Capital Territory Ministry
List of Australian Capital Territory ministries

References

External links
https://www.act.gov.au/ ACT Government website
https://classic.austlii.edu.au/au/legis/cth/consol_act/acta1988482/index.html#s24/ The Self-Government Act 1988 (Cth) in AustLII